Fritz Tegtmeier (30 July 1917 – 8 April 1999) was a World War II Luftwaffe 146 aerial victories Flying ace and recipient of the coveted Knight's Cross of the Iron Cross. The Knight's Cross of the Iron Cross was awarded to recognize extreme battlefield bravery or successful military leadership. A flying ace or fighter ace is a military aviator credited with shooting down five or more enemy aircraft during aerial combat.

Military career
Fritz Tegtmeier was posted to the 2. Staffel (2nd Squadron) of Jagdgeschwader 54 (JG 54—54th Fighter Wing) in October 1940. He was severely injured on 17 November 1940 when his Messerschmitt Bf 109 E-1 (Werknummer 6043—factory number) suffered engined failure, resulting in crash landing at Jever Airfield. He returned to his Staffel in the spring of 1941 and claimed his first aerial victory on 22 June 1941, the first day of Operation Barbarossa on the Eastern Front. 

On 8 September, I. Gruppe moved to an airfield at Siversky located southwest of Leningrad. There, on 11 September he was again severely injured in a collision in his Bf 109 F-2 resulting in a crash landing at Siversky. He returned to active duty in April 1942 and was assigned to the 1. Staffel of JG 54. By the end of 1942 he had claimed 24 aerial victories.

On 14 January 1943, Tegtmeier became an "ace-in-a-day" for the first time. That day, pilots of I. Gruppe had claimed 30 aerual victories. He claimed aerial victories number 36 and 37 on 23 January. On 3 May 1943 he claimed numbers 51–53 and was posted to Ergänzungs-Jagdgruppe Ost as fighter pilot instructor. He returned to front line duty, this time with the 3. Staffel of JG 54, in September 1943. In November 1943 he achieved his 75th aerial victory. He was awarded the Knight's Cross of the Iron Cross on 28 March 1944 following his 99th aerial victory. Tegtmeier was promoted to Leutnant on 20 April 1944. He claimed his 100th and 101st aerial victory on 3 May 1944. He was the 71st Luftwaffe pilot to achieve the century mark. In October 1944 he was made Staffelkapitän of the 3. Staffel of JG 54. By the end of 1944 his score of aerial victories stood at 139 claims. When he was transferred to Jagdgeschwader 7 (JG 7—7th Fighter Wing) for flight training on the Messerschmitt Me 262 jet fighter in March 1945 his score stood at 146 aerial victories. Fritz Tegtmeier had been nominated for the Oak Leaves to the Knight's Cross.

Summary of career

Aerial victory claims
According to US historian David T. Zabecki, Tegtmeier was credited with 146 aerial victories. Mathews and Foreman, authors of Luftwaffe Aces — Biographies and Victory Claims, researched the German Federal Archives and found records for 146 aerial victory claims, all of which claimed on the Eastern Front.

Victory claims were logged to a map-reference (PQ = Planquadrat), for example "PQ 01852". These sectors were then subdivided into 36 smaller units to give a location area 3 × 4 km in size.

Awards
 Iron Cross (1939) 2nd and 1st Class
 Honour Goblet of the Luftwaffe (5 October 1942)
 German Cross in Gold on 23 January 1943 as Oberfeldwebel in the I./Jagdgeschwader 54
 Knight's Cross of the Iron Cross on 28 March 1944 as Oberfeldwebel and pilot in the 2./Jagdgeschwader 54

Notes

References

Citations

Bibliography

External links

1917 births
1999 deaths
People from Minden-Lübbecke
People from the Province of Westphalia
German World War II flying aces
Luftwaffe pilots
Recipients of the Gold German Cross
Recipients of the Knight's Cross of the Iron Cross
Military personnel from North Rhine-Westphalia